The 1971 Synod of Bishops was the second ordinary general assembly in the history of the Synod of Bishops. Its agenda consisted of two subjects: Ministerial Priesthood and Justice in the World.  The synod supported Pope Paul VI's stand on clerical celibacy, with a sizable opposition.

References

Synod of bishops in the Catholic Church
1971 in Vatican City
20th-century Catholicism
Pope Paul VI
Episcopacy in the Catholic Church
Catholic priesthood
1971 in Christianity
1971 conferences